Uwe Kils is a German marine biologist specializing in Antarctic biology.

Career
His work led to the development of instruments for in situ observation of underwater fauna, including the ecoSCOPE and the first software for full speed video processing. Later work at Kiel included the study of predator-prey interactions of juvenile herring and plankton, for which a floating laboratory was built called ATOLL.

Awards

Photos by Kils

Selected publications

 Kils, U.: "Swimming Behavior, Swimming Performance, and Energy Balance of Antarctic krill Euphausia superba", translation of Ph.D. thesis in German from 1979, College Station, Texas; 1981. Available free via Wikisource
 Kils, U., Klages, N. (1979) "Der Krill" Naturwissenschaftliche Rundschau, 10: 397–402.
 Kils, U. (1987) "Verhaltensphysiologische Untersuchungen an pelagischen Schwärmen – Schwarmbildung als Strategie zur Orientierung in Umwelt-Gradienten. Bedeutung der Schwarmbildung in der Aquakultur", (Habilitation), Universität Kiel, Ber Inst Meereskunde, Kiel 163: 1–168.
 Kils, U. (1983) Swimming and feeding of Antarctic Krill, Euphausia superba – some outstanding energetics and dynamics – some unique morphological details. In: Berichte zur Polarforschung, Alfred-Wegener-Institut fuer Polarforschung, Sonderheft 4 (1983). On the biology of Krill Euphausia superba, Proceedings of the Seminar and Report of Krill Ecology Group, ed. S. B. Schnack, 130 – 155
 Kils, U., Marschall, P. (1995) "Der Krill, wie er schwimmt und frisst – neue Einsichten mit neuen Methoden" (The Antarctic krill – feeding and swimming performances – new insights with new methods). In: Hempel, I., Hempel, G., Biologie der Polarmeere – Erlebnisse und Ergebnisse. Gustav Fischer Jena – Stuttgart – New York, 201 – 207
 Kils, U., (2006) "So frisst der Krill" How krill feeds. In: Hempel, G., Hempel, I., Schiel, S., Faszination Meeresforschung, Ein oekologisches Lesebuch. Hauschild Bremen, 112–115.

References

External links

1951 births
Living people
German marine biologists
Fisheries scientists
20th-century German zoologists
21st-century German zoologists